Hippotion griveaudi is a moth of the family Sphingidae. It is known from Madagascar.

References

 Pinhey, E. (1962): Hawk Moths of Central and Southern Africa. Longmans Southern Africa, Cape Town.

Hippotion
Moths described in 1968
Moths of Madagascar
Moths of Africa
Taxa named by Robert Herbert Carcasson